Sauk Prairie High School is a public high school located in Prairie du Sac, Wisconsin. It is part of the Sauk Prairie School District.

River Arts Center 
The River Arts Center section of the high school was opened in 2000. The building has a gallery for displaying artwork created by students and a theater where most of the school's plays and concerts are performed.

Extracurricular activities

Athletics 
Athletic teams include:
 Boys' and girls' cross country
 Boys' soccer
 Boys' and girls' swimming
 Boys' tennis
 Boys' and girls' track
 Boys' and girls' basketball
 Boys' and girls' hockey
 Boys' lacrosse, Division 2 State Champions 2011, 2017
 Boys' golf
 Girls' soccer
 Girls' tennis
 Football
 Football cheerleading
 Dance team
 Gymnastics
 Baseball
 Softball
 Volleyball
 Wrestling

Sauk Prairie has a rivalry with the Baraboo Thunderbirds. The two schools, both members of the Badger North Conference, play each other annually for the "Mega Bowl Trophy" in football. Sauk Prairie has also had a long rivalry with the Lodi Blue Devils, even though the teams play in separate conferences. In basketball, the "Wisconsin River Classic" is played between Sauk Prairie and Lodi. They Battle for the Paddle. The paddle is blue on one side and red on the other. Sauk leads the trophy series 4-2, losing to Lodi in 2019, 61–53. SPHS won state championships in boys cross country in 1968 and 1969.

Clubs and organizations 
Student clubs and organizations include:
 FFA
 FBLA 
 Student Council
 Latino Club
 Drama
 Forensics
 Skills U.S.A.
 Quiz Bowl Team
 French Club 
 Musicals
 Marching Band
 Art Club
 National Honor Society
 GSA
 Philosophy and spoon carving club

Sauk Prairie has two competitive show choirs, the mixed-gender Executive Session and the women's-only YTBN. The choirs are noted for performing shows that feature selections from a specific musical every year. The choirs also host an annual competition, the Sauk Prairie Executive Session Invitational.

Notable alumni 
 Paul Gruber, former NFL player
 Greg Jensen, former NFL player
 Scott Schutt, former NFL player
 Dirk Been, Cast member of Survivor

See also
 List of high schools in Wisconsin

References

External links
Sauk Prairie High School website

Public high schools in Wisconsin
Education in Sauk County, Wisconsin